Rajshahi Metropolitan Police (RMP) is a division of Bangladesh Police, which is responsible for law enforcement within the metropolis of Rajshahi.

History 
Rajshahi Metropolitan Police was established on 1 July 1992. RMP began with four police stations-Boalia, Rajpara, Motihar and Shah Makhdum with an area of 203 square kilometers in 1992. RMP is headed by a Police Commissioner.

In April 2017, assistant commissioner Sabbir Ahmed Sorfaraj committed suicide at an official police officers dorm under suspicious circumstances.

Rajshahi Metropolitan Police launched a Quick Response Team in December 2018.

In August 2019, Constable Sabbir Hossain was beaten by a mob after he got drunk and harassed a woman.

Rajshahi Metropolitan Police arrested nine of their own for gambling in public and the nine officers were subsequently suspended in January 2021. In November 2021, the Rajshahi Metropolitan Police introduced wearable cameras for their officers. In May 2021, Assistant Commissioner of Rajshahi Metropolitan Police Nazmul Hasan and superintendent of police of Rapid Action Battalion-5 SM Fazlul Huq were suspended after an audio conversation of them leaked in which they were heard criticizing Rapid Action Battalion and promotions in Bangladesh Police. Following which 50 police officers were transferred from Rapid Action Battalion and back to Bangladesh Police.

In March 2021, Inspector Hosne Ara Begum filed complaints against two Rajshai Metropolitan Police Officers in Charge (OCs), Nibaran Chandra Barman and Mahbub Alam, her first husband who she divorced. She accused them of sexual harassment and detaining her second husband on false allegations. Constable Nimaichandra Sarker was arrested for murdering a woman in April 2021. He had previously been suspended for leaking a nude video of a woman.

Rajshahi Metropolitan Police Commissioner Abu Kalam Siddique transferred 650 constables after a three-day visit by Inspector General of Police Benazir Ahmed in January 2022. Ahmed inaugurated the Police FF Memorial Museum during his visit.

Divisions
RMP is divided into four divisions with four DC as head, DC (Boalia), DC (Kasiadanga), DC (Motihar), DC (Shah Makhdum).
Boalia - Rajpara, Chandrima and Boalia Thana.
Kasiadanga- Kasiadanga, Karnahar, Damkura Thana.
Motihar- Motihar, Katakhali and Belpukur thana.
Shah Makhdum-Shah Makhdum, Airport and Paba thana.

Police stations
There were four police station under RMP when inaugurated. New 8 police stations are added in February, 2018.
Boalia Thana
Rajpara Thana
Motihar Thana
Shahmukhdum Thana
Chandrima Thana
Kasiadanga Thana
Katakhali Thana
Belpukur Thana
Airport Thana
Karnahar Thana
Damkura Thana
Paba Thana

Controversy
In 2012 Rajshahi Metropolitan Police was accused of extortion and being involved in the drug trade. A sub-inspector was accused of raping a constable.

References

Rajshahi
Municipal law enforcement agencies of Bangladesh
1992 establishments in Bangladesh